This is a list of schools in the Isle of Man. It includes schools funded by the Isle of Man Department of Education and independent schools.

Primary schools

 Anagh Coar Primary School
 Andreas Primary School
 Arbory Primary School
 Ashley Hill Primary School
 Ballacottier Primary School
 Ballasalla Primary School
 Ballaugh Primary School
 Bemahague School
 Braddan Primary School
 Bride Infants School
 Bunscoill Ghaelgagh (Manx language)
 Bunscoill Rhumsaa
 Cronk-y-Berry Primary School
 Dhoon Primary School
 Foxdale Primary School
 Henry Bloom Noble Primary School
 Jurby Primary School
 Kewaigue Primary School
 Kirk Michael Primary School
 Laxey Primary School
 Manor Park Primary School
 Marown Primary School
 Onchan Primary School
 Peel Clothworkers Primary School
 Rushen Primary School
 Scoill Phurt Le Moirrey
 Scoill Vallajeelt
 Scoill yn Jubilee
 St. John's Primary School
 St. Mary's Primary School
 Sulby Primary School
 Victoria Road Primary School
 Willaston Primary School

Secondary schools

 Ballakermeen High School, Douglas
 St Ninian's High School, Douglas and Onchan
 Castle Rushen High School, Castletown
 Queen Elizabeth II High School, Peel
 Ramsey Grammar School, Ramsey

Independent schools
 King William's College, Castletown (ages 3–18)
 The Buchan School, Castletown (ages 3–11), independent primary school, junior school for King William's College
 Market Square Preparatory School, Castletown (ages 2–11) Independent Primary School

See also
 University College Isle of Man
 List of universities in the Isle of Man

 
Isle of Man
Schools